Ovaliviridae is a family of viruses of archaea that is not assigned to any higher taxonomic ranks. The family contains a single genus, Alphaovalivirus, which contains a single species, Sulfolobus ellipsoid virus 1. The linear genome of dsDNA is 23,219 bp with 172 bp inverted terminal repeats. Sulfolobus ellipsoid virus 1 was isolated from an acidic hot spring (86−106oC, pH 2.2−2.5) in Laguna Fumarólica, Costa Rica; the only known host is Sulfolobus sp. A20.

References

External links
ICTV Report: Ovaliviridae

Virus families